The Men's 1500 Freestyle at the 10th FINA World Swimming Championships (25m) was swum 19 December 2010. 30 individuals swam the event, which was a timed-final where each swimmer swam just once. The top 8 seeded swimmers swam in the evening, and the remain swimmers swam in the morning session.

At the start of the event, the existing World (WR) and Championship records (CR) were:

No new world or competition records were set during this competition.

Results

References

Freestyle 1500 metre, Men's
World Short Course Swimming Championships